The National Counties Building Society is a UK building society, which has its head office in Epsom, Surrey. It is a member of the Building Societies Association.

Founded as the Fourth Post Office Mutual Society in 1896, it was renamed as National Counties in 1972 and its membership no longer limited to Post Office staff.  Mostly a postal and online based building society, it has one branch in Epsom.

On 14 July 2014 the society founded the Family Building Society. This was the first building society to launch in the United Kingdom since the Ecology Building Society opened in 1981.

References

External links
 National Counties Building Society
 Building Societies Association
 KPMG Building Societies Database 2008

Building societies of England
Banks established in 1896
Organizations established in 1896
Organisations based in Surrey
1896 establishments in the United Kingdom